Reginald Hack (25 February 1907 – 31 October 1971) was an Australian cricketer. He played in one first-class match for South Australia in 1933/34.

See also
 List of South Australian representative cricketers

References

External links
 

1907 births
1971 deaths
Australian cricketers
South Australia cricketers
Cricketers from Adelaide